Lesego Calayel Makgothi (born 23 February 1965, Maseru) is a Lesotho diplomat who has served as the Minister of Foreign Affairs of the Kingdom of Lesotho from 2017 to 2020.

Foreign minister
In 2017 he negotiated the arrival of foreign peacekeepers in Lesotho.

In February 2019, Makgothi met with Russian Foreign Minister Sergey Lavrov and spoke on expanding relations between Lesotho and Russia.

External links
Official government profile

References

Living people
1965 births
People from Maseru
Foreign Ministers of Lesotho
Lesotho diplomats